"Need It" is a song by American hip hop trio Migos featuring American rapper YoungBoy Never Broke Again. It was released on May 22, 2020, as the lead single from Migos' fourth studio album Culture III. Produced by Buddah Bless, the song samples "Get In My Car" by 50 Cent.

Background and composition 
The song was previewed in January 2020, when a video of Offset and NBA YoungBoy recording it was surfaced online. Migos seemingly hinted at its release hours before it arrived. On the track, the trio and YoungBoy talk about their intoxicating and violent lifestyles and how they will protect themselves.

Charts

Weekly charts

Year-end charts

Certifications

References 

2020 singles
2020 songs
Migos songs
YoungBoy Never Broke Again songs
Songs written by Quavo
Songs written by Offset (rapper)
Songs written by Takeoff (rapper)
Songs written by YoungBoy Never Broke Again
Songs written by 50 Cent
Songs written by Hi-Tek
Songs written by Buddah Bless
Song recordings produced by Buddah Bless
Motown singles